The 1996 Denver Broncos season was the franchise's 27th season in the National Football League, the 37th overall and their 2nd under head coach Mike Shanahan. The Broncos improved on their 8–8 record from 1995 and finished the season with a 13–3 record. They also cliched the AFC West for the first time since 1991, and earning the top seed in the AFC Playoffs.

In the playoffs, the Broncos were upset by the Jacksonville Jaguars in the Divisional Round, 30–27. Prior to their defeat, they were the top-seeded team in the NFL and were heavily favored to go to and win the Super Bowl by many analysts, breaking the AFC losing streak from the 1980s. The loss rendered the 1996 Broncos team as a historic failure, as it was a major Super Bowl or bust year. This was also the final year the Broncos wore their "Orange Crush" uniforms.

Offseason

NFL Draft 

The team was also set to pick University of Nebraska quarterback Brook Berringer. Berringer was killed in a plane crash two days before the draft.

Personnel

Staff

Roster

Regular season

Schedule

Standings

Postseason

Schedule

AFC Divisional Playoffs: vs (5) Jacksonville Jaguars

Awards and records 
Pro Bowl
 
QB John Elway

RB Terrell Davis

TE Shannon Sharpe

T Gary Zimmerman

DE Alfred Williams

DT Michael Perry

LB Bill Romanowski
 
S Steve Atwater
 
S Tyrone Braxton

AP Offensive Player of the Year – Terrell Davis

UPI AFL-AFC Offensive MVP – Terrell Davis (1996 was the last year this award was given out)

Terrell Davis set franchise rushing record for most carries (345) in a season and most rushing touchdowns (13) in a season

Milestones 
Terrell Davis reached 1,000 yards faster than any Denver Bronco running back in franchise history

References

External links 
 Denver Broncos – 1996 media guide
 Broncos on Pro Football Reference
 Broncos Schedule on jt-sw.com

Denver Broncos
Denver Broncos seasons
AFC West championship seasons
Bronco